This comprehensive list of  wins accounts races won by the  cycling team. The races are categorised according to the UCI Continental Circuits rules.

1997

Route Adélie de Vitré, Nicolas Jalabert
Overall Tour de l´Ain, Bobby Julich
Stage 2 Volta a la Comunidad Valenciana, Maurizio Fondriest
GP de la Ville de Rennes, Nicolas Jalabert
Gent–Wevelgem, Philippe Gaumont
Stage 11 Tour de France, Laurent Desbiens

1998

Tour de l´Avenir, Christophe Rinero
Criterium d´Abruzzo, Francesco Casagrande
A Travers le Morbihan, Laurent Desbiens
Stage 8 Paris — Nice, Christophe Capelle
Overall Critérium International, Bobby Julich
Stage 3b KBC Driedaagse van De Panne — Koksijde, David Millar
Grand Prix de Plumelec-Morbihan, Laurent Desbiens
Trofeo Matteotti, Francesco Casagrande
Clasica Ciclista San Sebastián, Francesco Casagrande

1999

Overall Tour de l´Ain, Grzegorz Gwiazdowski
Grand Prix d'Ouverture La Marseillaise, Frank Vandenbroucke
Omloop Het Volk/Nieuwsblad, Frank Vandenbroucke
Stage 4 Paris — Nice, Laurent Roux
Stage 7 Paris — Nice, Frank Vandenbroucke
Stage 3b KBC Driedaagse van De Panne — Koksijde, Frank Vandenbroucke
Liège — Bastogne — Liège, Frank Vandenbroucke
Trophée des Grimpeurs, Laurent Roux
Stage 4 Critérium du Dauphiné, Laurent Desbiens
Stage 6 Critérium du Dauphiné, david Moncoutie
Züri Metzgete, Grzegorz Gwiazdowski
Boucles de l´Aulne, Claude Lamour
Stages 16 & 19 Vuelta a España, Frank Vandenbroucke

2000

Omloop van het Houtland Lichtervelde, Niko Eeckhout
Étoile de Bessèges, Jo Planckaert
Stage 5 Vuelta a Andalucía, Jo Planckaert
Grand Prix de Lillers Souvenir Bruno Comini, Francis Moreau
GP Rudy Dhaenens, Niko Eeckhout
Tro-Bro Léon, Jo Planckaert
 Time Trial Championship, Steve Fogen
Stage 1 Tour de France, David Millar
Kampioenschap van Vlaanderen, Niko Eeckhout
Critérium de Oostrozebeke, Niko Eeckhout

2001

Circuit Cycliste Sarthe — Pays de la Loire, David Millar
Circuit des Ardennes, Cédric Loue
GP Stad Kortrijk, Niko Eeckhout
Overall Étoile de Bessèges, Niko Eeckhout
Stage 1, Niko Eeckhout
Grand Prix de Lillers Souvenir Bruno Comini, Jean-Michel Tessier
Stage 2 Guldensporentweedaagse, Janek Tombak
Prologue Paris — Nice, Nico Mattan
Dwars door Vlaanderen, Niko Eeckhout
Overall KBC Driedaagse van De Panne — Koksijde, Nico Mattan
Stage 3b, Nico Mattan
Stage 4b  Euskal Bizikleta, David Millar
Stage 5 Critérium du Dauphiné, Andreï Kivilev
 Road Championship, Janek Tombak
Overall Tour of Denmark, David Millar
Stage 2, Niko Eeckhout
Stage 5, David Millar
GP Ouest France-Plouay, Nico Mattan
GP Jef Scherens Leuven, Niko Eeckhout
Delta Profronde, Niko Eeckhout
Stages 1 & 6 Vuelta a España, David Millar
Memorial Rik Van Steenbergen, Niko Eeckhout
Overall Circuit Franco-Belge, Chris Peers
Stage 1, Chris Peers
Stage 3, Niko Eeckhout
Critérium de Oostrozebeke, Chris Peers
Giro del Piemonte, Nico Mattan

2002

Antwerpen na-tour Dernyspektakel, Nico Mattan
Clasica Internacional a Alcobendas, David Moncoutié
GP Stad Kortrijk, Jo Planckaert
Stage 2 Critérium International, David Moncoutié
Stage 2 Four Days of Dunkirk, Janek Tombak
Stage 5 Four Days of Dunkirk, Cédric Vasseur
Stage 7 Volta Ciclista a Catalunya, Dmitriy Fofonov
Stage 13 Tour de France, David Millar
Stage 4 Tour de l´Ain, Marek Rutkiewicz
Tour du Poitou Charentes et de la Vienne, Guido Trentin
Stage 5 Vuelta a España, Guido Trentin
Stage 3 Tour de Pologne, Janek Tombak
GP d´Isbergues, Cédric Vasseur

2003

Omloop van de Vlaamse Scheldeboorden, Chris Peers
Paris–Corrèze, Cédric Vasseur
International Hessen Rundfahrt, Cédric Vasseur
 Road Championship, Stuart O'Grady
Stages 6 & 8 Tour de Langkawi, Stuart O'Grady
Stage 2 Étoile de Bessèges, Jo Planckaert
Stage 4 Tour Méditerranéen, David Moncoutié
Gran Premio di Lugano, David Moncoutié
Prologue Driedaagse West-Vlaanderen, David Millar
Prologue Paris — Nice, Nico Mattan
Tour de Picardie, David Millar
E.O.S Tallinn GP, Arnaud Coyot
Stage 7 Critérium du Dauphiné, Cédric Vasseur
Stage 1 Route du Sud, Janek Tombak
Stage 4 Route du Sud, David Moncoutié
 Road Championship, Janek Tombak
Stage 19 Tour de France, David Millar
Stage 1 Tour de la Région Wallonne, Niko Eeckhout
Stage 4 Vuelta a Burgos, David Millar
Overall Tour du Limousin, Massimiliano
Stage 2, Cédric Vasseur
Tour du Poitou Charentes et de la Vienne, Robert Sassone
Stage 2 Vuelta a España, Luis Pérez Rodríguez
Memorial Rik Van Steenbergen, Niko Eeckhout
Stage 7 Tour de Pologne, Hayden Roulston
Stage 17 Vuelta a España, David Millar

2004

Profronde van Made, Igor Astarloa
Gran Premio di Lugano, Frédéric Bessy
Stage 1 Four Days of Dunkirk, Jimmy Casper
Stage 4 Tour de Picardie, Jimmy Casper
GP de Villers Cotterêts, Stuart O'Grady
Stages 5 & 7 Critérium du Dauphiné, Stuart O'Grady
Stage 5 Tour de France, Stuart O'Grady
Stage 11 Tour de France, David Moncoutié
Stage 1 Brixia Tour, Igor Astarloa
Stage 1 Tour de la Région Wallonne, Hayden Roulston
Vattenfall Cyclassics, Stuart O'Grady
Stage 1 Tour of Denmark, Stuart O'Grady
Stage 3 Tour of Denmark, Janek Tombak
Stage 6 Tour of Denmark, Jimmy Casper
Stage 4 Tour de l´Ain, Cédric Vasseur
Stage 4 Tour du Limousin, Cédric Vasseur
Overall Circuit Franco-Belge, Jimmy Casper
Stage 2, Jimmy Casper

2005

Stage 4 Tour Down Under, Matthew White
Stage 5 Étoile de Bessèges, Jimmy Casper
Stage 2 Vuelta Ciclista al Pais Vasco, David Moncoutié
Overall Circuit Cycliste Sarthe, Sylvain Chavanel
Stage 4, Sylvain Chavanel
Grand Prix de Denain Porte du Hainaut, Jimmy Casper
Tour de Picardie, Janek Tombak
E.O.S Tallinn GP, Janek Tombak
 Time Trial Championship, Sylvain Chavanel
Stage 12 Tour de France, David Moncoutié
Stage 4 Tour de la Région Wallonne, Guido Trentin
Stage 3 Tour du Limousin, Leonardo Bertagnolli
Châteauroux Classic de l´Indre Trophée Fenioux, Jimmy Casper
Tour du Poitou Charentes et de la Vienne, Sylvain Chavanel
Stage 2 Vuelta a España, Leonardo Bertagnolli

2006

Tour du Haut Var, Leonardo Bertagnolli
Classic Haribo, Arnaud Coyot
Stage 6 Tirreno–Adriatico, Leonardo Bertagnolli
GP Cholet, Chris Sutton
Grand Prix de Denain, Jimmy Casper
Stage 7 Giro d'Italia, Rik Verbrugghe
Overall Tour de Picardie, Jimmy Casper
Stage 3, Jimmy Casper
 Time Trial Championships, Sylvain Chavanel
Stage 1 Tour de France, Jimmy Casper
Overall Tour du Limousin, Leonardo Duque
Stage 3, Stéphane Augé
Overall Tour du Poitou Charentes, Sylvain Chavanel
Stage 4 Tour de l'Avenir, Nicolas Roche
Stage 5 Tour de Pologne, Stéphane Augé

2007

Overall Étoile de Bessèges, Nick Nuyens
Stage 3, Nick Nuyens
GP Cholet, Stéphane Augé
Stage 5 Circuit de la Sarthe, Chris Sutton
Stage 1 Four Days of Dunkirk, Bradley Wiggins
Prologue Critérium du Dauphiné Libéré, Bradley Wiggins
Stage 2 GP CTT Correios de Portugal, Tyler Farrar
Stage 3 Route du Sud, Amaël Moinard
Prologue Eneco Tour, Michiel Elijzen
Stage 1 Eneco Tour, Nick Nuyens
Châteauroux Classic, Chris Sutton
Stage 1 Tour du Poitou-Charentes, Chris Sutton
Stage 4 Tour du Poitou-Charentes, Bradley Wiggins
Stage 16 Vuelta a España, Leonardo Duque
Duo Normand, Bradley Wiggins & Michiel Elijzen

2008

Grand Prix d'Ouverture La Marseillaise, Hervé Duclos-Lassalle
Stage 4 Tour Méditerranéen, Leonardo Duque
Stage 5 Tour Méditerranéen, Sylvain Chavanel
Stage 6 Paris–Nice, Sylvain Chavanel
Dwars door Vlaanderen, Sylvain Chavanel
Brabantse Pijl, Sylvain Chavanel
Stage 2 Circuit de la Sarthe, Samuel Dumoulin
Overall Four Days of Dunkirk, Stéphane Augé
Stage 1, Stéphane Augé
Stage 3 Tour de Picardie, Jean-Eudes Demaret
Stage 5 Volta a Catalunya, Sylvain Chavanel
 Time Trial Championships, Sylvain Chavanel
Stage 3 Tour de France, Samuel Dumoulin
Stage 19 Tour de France, Sylvain Chavanel
Stage 7 Deutschland Tour, Stéphane Augé
Stage 8 Vuelta a España, David Moncoutié
 Mountains classification in the Vuelta a España, David Moncoutié
Stages 2 & 5 Tour du Poitou-Charentes, Samuel Dumoulin

2009

Grand Prix d'Ouverture La Marseillaise, Rémi Pauriol
Stage 5 Étoile de Bessèges, Jean-Eudes Demaret
Stage 6 Tour Méditerranéen, David Moncoutié
Gran Premio di Lugano, Rémi Pauriol
Stage 1 Tirreno–Adriatico, Julien El Fares
Stage 5 Circuit de la Sarthe, Jean-Eudes Demaret
Stage 7 Critérium du Dauphiné Libéré, David Moncoutié
 Road Race Championships, Rein Taaramäe
 Time Trial Championships, Rein Taaramäe
Overall Tour de Wallonie, Julien El Fares
Overall Tour de l'Ain, Rein Taaramäe
Stage 1, Mickaël Buffaz
Stage 4, Rein Taaramäe
Stage 2 Tour du Limousin, Samuel Dumoulin
Stage 13 Vuelta a España, David Moncoutié
 Mountains classification in the Vuelta a España, David Moncoutié

2010

Stage 2 La Tropicale Amissa Bongo, Samuel Dumoulin
Overall Étoile de Bessèges, Samuel Dumoulin
Stage 3, Samuel Dumoulin
Stage 4 Tour Méditerranéen, Julien El Fares
Gran Premio dell'Insubria-Lugano, Samuel Dumoulin
Le Samyn, Jens Keukeleire
Overall Driedaagse van West-Vlaanderen, Jens Keukeleire
Stage 1, Jens Keukeleire
Stage 7 Paris–Nice, Amaël Moinard
Nokere Koerse, Jens Keukeleire
GP Cholet, Leonardo Duque
Stage 6 Volta a Catalunya, Samuel Dumoulin
Stage 4 Circuit de la Sarthe, Samuel Dumoulin
Paris–Camembert, Sébastien Minard
Stage 17 Giro d'Italia, Damien Monier
Stage 3 Tour de Luxembourg, Tony Gallopin
Overall Route du Sud, David Moncoutié
Stage 2b, David Moncoutié
 Road Race Championships, Kalle Kriit
Overall Paris–Corrèze, Mickaël Buffaz
Stage 1, Mickaël Buffaz
Stage 8 Vuelta a España, David Moncoutié
 Mountains classification in the Vuelta a España, David Moncoutié

2011

Stage 3 Étoile de Bessèges, Samuel Dumoulin
Overall La Méditerranéenne, David Moncoutié
Stage 5, David Moncoutié
Stage 1 Tour du Haut Var, Samuel Dumoulin
Stages 5 & 7 Volta a Catalunya, Samuel Dumoulin
Flèche d'Emeraude, Tony Gallopin
Tartu GP, Jean-Eudes Demaret
Stage 4 Route du Sud, Luis Ángel Maté
 Time Trial Championships, Rein Taaramäe
Stage 3 Tour of Austria, Jens Keukeleire
Overall Paris–Corrèze, Samuel Dumoulin
Stage 1, Samuel Dumoulin
Stage 2 Danmark Rundt, Remy Cusin
Overall Tour de l'Ain, David Moncoutié
Stage 2 Tour du Limousin, Tony Gallopin
Stage 11 Vuelta a España, David Moncoutié
Stage 14 Vuelta a España, Rein Taaramäe
 Mountains classification in the Vuelta a España, David Moncoutié

2012

 Road Race Championships, Aleksejs Saramotins
 Time Trial Championships, Rein Taaramäe
Grand Prix d'Ouverture La Marseillaise, Samuel Dumoulin
Stage 3 Vuelta a Asturias, Rémy Di Gregorio
Stage 2 Boucles de la Mayenne, Nico Sijmens
Overall Paris–Corrèze, Egoitz García

2013

Stage 4 La Tropicale Amissa Bongo, Adrien Petit
Vuelta a Murcia, Daniel Navarro
Classic Loire Atlantique, Edwig Cammaerts
Overall Rhône-Alpes Isère Tour, Nico Sijmens
Stage 3, Nico Sijmens
Overall Tour of Estonia, Gert Jõeäär
 Road Race Championships, Rein Taaramäe
 Mountains classification in the Vuelta a España, Nicolas Edet
Overall Tour du Gévaudan, Yoann Bagot
Stage 1, Yoann Bagot

2014

 National U23 Cyclo-cross championships, Clément Venturini
Overall Driedaagse van West-Vlaanderen, Gert Jõeäär
Prologue, Gert Jõeäär
Tro-Bro Léon, Adrien Petit
Stage 3 Tour of Turkey, Rein Taaramäe
Stage 3 Rhône-Alpes Isère Tour, Nicolas Edet
Stage 4 Rhône-Alpes Isère Tour, Clément Venturini
Grand Prix de Plumelec-Morbihan, Julien Simon
 Time Trial Championships, Gert Jõeäär
Stage 13 Vuelta a España, Daniel Navarro
Tour du Doubs, Rein Taaramäe

2015

Stages 1 & 4 Circuit de la Sarthe, Nacer Bouhanni
Grand Prix de Denain, Nacer Bouhanni
Stage 2 Four Days of Dunkirk, Jonas Ahlstrand
Prologue Tour de Luxembourg, Adrien Petit
Overall Boucles de la Mayenne, Anthony Turgis
Stage 2, Anthony Turgis
Stages 2 & 4 Critérium du Dauphiné, Nacer Bouhanni
Halle–Ingooigem, Nacer Bouhanni
 Time Trial Championships, Gert Jõeäär
 Road Race Championships, Gert Jõeäär
Circuito de Getxo, Nacer Bouhanni
Stages 1 & 2 Tour de l'Ain, Nacer Bouhanni
Stage 3 Tour du Limousin, Rudy Molard
Grand Prix d'Isbergues, Nacer Bouhanni
Tour de Vendée, Christophe Laporte,
Stage 4 Tour de l'Eurométropole, Jonas Ahlstrand
Nationale Sluitingsprijs, Nacer Bouhanni

2016

Stage 2 Vuelta a Andalucía, Nacer Bouhanni
Stage 4 Paris–Nice, Nacer Bouhanni
Classic Loire Atlantique, Anthony Turgis
Stages 1 & 2 Volta a Catalunya, Nacer Bouhanni
Stage 1 Critérium du Dauphiné, Nacer Bouhanni
 Time Trial Championships, Gert Jõeäär
Stage 2 Tour of Austria, Clément Venturini
Tour de Vendée, Nacer Bouhanni

2017

 National Cyclo-cross championships, Clément Venturini
Stage 2 Tour du Haut Var, Julien Simon
Nokere Koerse, Nacer Bouhanni
Stage 4 Volta a Catalunya, Nacer Bouhanni
Paris–Camembert, Nacer Bouhanni
Stage 2 Tour de Yorkshire, Nacer Bouhanni
 Overall Four Days of Dunkirk, Clément Venturini
Stage 3 Tour de Luxembourg, Anthony Perez
Stage 6 Tour of Austria, Clément Venturini
Stage 2 Tour de l'Ain, Nacer Bouhanni

2018

Stage 2 Étoile de Bessèges, Christophe Laporte
Stages 1 & 3 Tour La Provence, Christophe Laporte
Tro-Bro Léon, Christophe Laporte
Stage 4 Tour de Yorkshire, Stéphane Rossetto
 Overall 4 Jours de Dunkerque, Dimitri Claeys
Stage 3, Nacer Bouhanni
Stage 1 Tour de l'Ain, Hugo Hofstetter
Grote Prijs Marcel Kint, Nacer Bouhanni
Stage 3 (ITT) Belgium Tour, Christophe Laporte
Prologue Boucles de la Mayenne, Dorian Godon
Stage 1 Tour de Luxembourg, Christophe Laporte
Stages 2 & 3 Boucles de la Mayenne, Nacer Bouhanni
Stage 4 Tour de Luxembourg, Anthony Perez
Stage 1 Route d'Occitanie, Nacer Bouhanni
 Time Trial Championships, Daniel Teklehaimanot
 Overall Tour du Limousin, Nicolas Edet
Stage 3, Nicolas Edet
Stage 6 Vuelta a España, Nacer Bouhanni
Tour du Doubs, Julien Simon

2019

Trofeo Campos, Porreres, Felanitx, Ses Salines, Jesús Herrada
 Overall Étoile de Bessèges, Christophe Laporte
Stages 2 & 4 (ITT), Christophe Laporte
Tour du Finistère, Julien Simon
 Overall Tour de Luxembourg, Jesús Herrada
Prologue & Stage 1, Christophe Laporte
Stages 3 & 4, Jesús Herrada
Mont Ventoux Dénivelé Challenge, Jesús Herrada
Dwars door het Hageland, Kenneth Vanbilsen
 Road Race Championships, Natnael Berhane
Schaal Sels, Attilio Viviani
 Overall Tour Poitou-Charentes en Nouvelle-Aquitaine, Christophe Laporte
Stages 1, 2 & 4 (ITT), Christophe Laporte
Stage 6 Vuelta a España, Jesús Herrada
La DH Famenne Ardenne Classic, Dimitri Claeys

2020

Stage 1 La Tropicale Amissa Bongo, Attilio Viviani
Stage 1 Tour du Haut Var, Anthony Perez
 Mountains classification Vuelta a España, Guillaume Martin

2021

Stage 1 Étoile de Bessèges, Christophe Laporte
Cholet-Pays de Loire, Elia Viviani
Circuit de Wallonie, Christophe Laporte
Trofeo Serra de Tramuntana, Jesús Herrada
Stage 8 Giro d'Italia, Victor Lafay
Mercan'Tour Classic Alpes-Maritimes, Guillaume Martin
Stage 1 Tour de Limousin, Christophe Laporte
Stages 1 & 3 Tour Poitou-Charentes en Nouvelle-Aquitaine, Elia Viviani
Grand Prix de Fourmies, Elia Viviani
Grand Prix de Wallonie, Christophe Laporte
Grand Prix d'Isbergues, Elia Viviani

2022

 Overall Étoile de Bessèges, Benjamin Thomas
Stage 2, Bryan Coquard
Stage 3, Benjamin Thomas
Stage 2 Tour de la Provence, Bryan Coquard
Grand Prix de Denain, Max Walscheid
Classic Loire Atlantique, Anthony Perez
Route Adélie, Axel Zingle
Stage 6 Tour of the Basque Country, Ion Izagirre
Classic Grand Besançon Doubs, Jesús Herrada
 Overall Boucles de la Mayenne, Benjamin Thomas
Stage 2, Benjamin Thomas
 Overall Tour de l'Ain, Guillaume Martin
Stage 2, Guillaume Martin
Stage 1 Arctic Race of Norway, Axel Zingle
Stage 3 Arctic Race of Norway, Victor Lafay
Stage 7 Vuelta a España, Jesús Herrada
Paris–Chauny, Simone Consonni
Famenne Ardenne Classic, Axel Zingle
Tour de Vendée, Bryan Coquard

2023

Stage 4 Tour Down Under, Bryan Coquard
Stage 5 Saudi Tour, Simone Consonni
Stage 2 Tour of Oman, Jesús Herrada
Faun Drôme Classic, Anthony Perez

Supplementary statistics
Sources

1997 to 2017

2018 to present

References

wins
Cofidis